The 2003 Tri Nations Series was contested from 12 July to 16 August between the national rugby union teams of Australia, New Zealand and South Africa. New Zealand won the tournament for the fifth time.

New Zealand regained the Bledisloe Cup which Australia had held since 1998.

Table

Results

External links
2003 Tri Nations Series at ESPN
Tri Nations at Rugby.com.au

Tri Nations Series
The Rugby Championship
Tri
Tri
Tri Nations